Jardel Nivaldo Vieira (born 29 March 1986), simply known as Jardel, is a Brazilian professional footballer who last played for Portuguese club Benfica as a central defender.

He spent most of his career at Benfica, having joined from Olhanense for €500,000 in January 2011, and became captain in September 2018. He made 288 appearances for the club and won 15 honours, including five Primeira Liga titles.

Career

Early career
Born in Florianópolis, Santa Catarina, Jardel was an Avaí FC youth graduate. Signing his first professional contract at the age of only 16, being promoted to the first team.

In March 2005, Jardel joined Esporte Clube Vitória, winning the year's Campeonato Baiano while at the club. After suffering relegation from Campeonato Brasileiro Série B, he signed for Santos FC on 15 January 2006.

Jardel left Peixe in December 2006 after making no appearances and struggling severely with injuries. He subsequently represented Iraty Sport Club, Avaí, Joinville Esporte Clube, Ituano FC and Desportivo Brasil before moving abroad.

In 2009, Jardel moved to Portugal, where he would remain in the following years. He played one season with G.D. Estoril Praia in the second division where he only missed two league games, then signed with S.C. Olhanense in the top level on a one-year deal. He made 19 total appearances in his half-season on the Algarve, scoring in a 3–1 win over Vitória de Setúbal on 2 October 2010 to put the team into second place.

Benfica
In January 2011, Jardel joined Portuguese club S.L. Benfica for a €500,000 transfer fee, replacing Chelsea-bound David Luiz. After two months of sporadic appearances, then manager Jorge Jesus dropped Sidnei and immediately inserted Jardel into the first team's starting lineup. On 28 April, he scored his first goal for the Lisbon side, in a 2–1 home win against S.C Braga for the campaign's UEFA Europa League semi-finals (2–2 aggregate loss), He finished his first season with 16 appearances and won his first piece of silverware; on 1 May on his return to the Estádio José Arcanjo in Olhão, he was sent off in a 1–1 draw.

The following season, Jardel made 18 appearances, serving mostly as backup to Luisão and Ezequiel Garay. He started the 2012–13 season with Benfica's reserves in division two. After Luisão's two-month suspension, however, he was propelled directly into the first team's starting XI. During the 2013–14 season, like his 2011–12 season, he made 18 appearances, serving backup to Luisão and Garay. However, he enjoyed success as the club won the domestic treble.

After the departure of Ezequiel Garay to Zenit Saint Petersburg, Jardel became a mainstay in Benfica's starting lineup. On 4 January 2015, Jardel scored his first goal for Benfica in the Primeira Liga, away at F.C. Penafiel (0–3). On 8 February 2015, Jardel scored a crucial last-minute goal to tie the Derby de Lisboa (1–1) in the Primeira Liga. He helped the club win their second straight Primeira Liga and Taça da Liga

In the 2015–16 season, Jardel enjoyed his best ever season, appearing in 44 games and scoring 5 goals. He played alongside three different centre backs, Luisão, Lisandro López and Victor Lindelöf, during the variation of the season. He scored the winner against Vitória de Setúbal (2–1) at the Estádio da Luz in the first half, securing Benfica's lead in the Primeira Liga. For the third straight season, he won the Primeira Liga and Taça da Liga.

Jardel's 2016–17 season was injury plagued, picking up a series of nagging injuries throughout the campaign. In the following season, he regained his starting position after the departure of Lindelöf to Manchester United. On 3 February 2018, he made his 200th appearance for the club and was elected man of the match after a goal and assist in a 5–1 home win against Rio Ave.

In September 2018, Jardel became club captain upon the retirement of long-serving compatriot Luisão, and extended his contract by a further year to 2021. He played 19 games as the Eagles regained the title from FC Porto on the last day, including one with a straight red card for elbowing Arsénio in a 3–1 home loss to Moreirense F.C. on 2 November.

Benfica announced in June 2021 that they would let Jardel's contract expire at the start of the new month, after 288 official appearances.

Personal life
Jardel acquired Portuguese citizenship in 2016.

Career statistics

Honours
Benfica
Primeira Liga: 2013–14, 2014–15, 2015–16, 2016–17, 2018–19
Taça de Portugal: 2013–14, 2016–17
Taça da Liga: 2010–11, 2011–12, 2013–14, 2014–15, 2015–16
Supertaça Cândido de Oliveira: 2014, 2017, 2019
UEFA Europa League runner-up: 2012–13, 2013–14
Individual
Florianópolis City Council Medal of Sports Merit

References

External links

 
 

1986 births
Living people
Sportspeople from Santa Catarina (state)
Brazilian footballers
Association football defenders
Avaí FC players
Esporte Clube Vitória players
Santos FC players
Iraty Sport Club players
Joinville Esporte Clube players
Ituano FC players
Primeira Liga players
Liga Portugal 2 players
G.D. Estoril Praia players
S.C. Olhanense players
S.L. Benfica footballers
S.L. Benfica B players
Brazilian expatriate footballers
Expatriate footballers in Portugal
Brazilian expatriate sportspeople in Portugal
Naturalised citizens of Portugal